Special Anti-terrorist Unit may refer to:

Special Anti-Terrorist Unit (Greece), Greek counter-terrorism unit of the Hellenic Police
Special Anti-Terrorist Unit (Serbia), special operations and police unit in Serbia